The Imperial Reservoir is an artificial lake formed by the construction of the Imperial Diversion Dam across the Colorado River in the Lower Colorado River Valley of Imperial County, California, and Yuma County, Arizona.

Dry wash watersheds
Dry washes are the major watershed feed systems to Imperial Reservoir. The next upstream major watershed feeder is the Bill Williams River from western Arizona. Upstream on the Colorado River, the basic feeder watershed to Imperial Reservoir is the Havasu-Mojave Lakes Watershed of Lake Havasu.

Two dry wash watershed attempt to enter the Imperial Reservoir from western Arizona, south of the Bill Williams River: the Bouse and Tyson Washes. Both washes end on the eastern perimeter of the Colorado River Indian Reservation along the Colorado River. Neither enters the river properly, except in the extreme flood stage.

No "lengthy" watersheds flow eastwards from California; all are short distances, in the extreme aridity of this desert region.

See also
 List of dams and reservoirs in California
 List of lakes in California

References

External links
Imperial Reservoir Watershed Map

Reservoirs in Yuma County, Arizona
National Wildlife Refuges in Arizona
Reservoirs in Imperial County, California
Colorado River
Reservoirs in California
Reservoirs in Arizona
Reservoirs in Southern California